Avenging Angel may refer to:

 Avenging Angel (1985 film), a 1985 film starring Betsy Russell
 Avenging Angel (2007 film), a 2007 TV film starring Kevin Sorbo
 Avenging Angel (album), a 2011 album by Craig Taborn
 "Avenging Angels" (song), a 1997 single by Space
 The Avenging Angel, a 1995 TV movie directed by Craig R. Baxley
 Saboteur II: Avenging Angel, a 1987 computer game for the ZX Spectrum
 Avenging Angel, a 1990 novel by Kwame Anthony Appiah
 Avenging Angel, a member of the Mormon Danite
 An early moniker for Warren Worthington III, an antihero in the Marvel Comics universe

See also 
 Destroying angel (disambiguation)